Museums of Tenerife, originally Autonomous Organization of Museums and Centers of Tenerife, is an organisation in Tenerife.

History 
The organisation was created by Cabildo de Tenerife in the early 1990s. In 2011 it was renamed from "Organismo Autónomo de Museos y Centros de Tenerife" to "Museos de Tenerife".

At present, it constitutes the most complete museum network in the Canary Islands.

Museums 
The organisation comprises the following museums:
 Museo de la Naturaleza y Arqueología
 Museo Arqueologico de Tenerife
 Instituto Canario de Bioantropología
 Museo de Ciencias Naturales de Tenerife
 Museum of Science and the Cosmos
 Museum of the History of Tenerife
 Sede Casa Lercaro
 Sede Casa de Carta
 Centro de Interpretación "Castillo de San Cristóbal"
 Centro de Documentación Canario-Americano
 Cueva del Viento

References 

Museums in Tenerife